Redman Presents...Reggie  is the seventh studio album by rapper Redman. It was released on December 7, 2010, through his own label Gilla House Records in conjunction with Def Jam Recordings. The original title of the album, as promoted in the booklet of Blackout! 2, was going to be Reggie Noble "0" 9 1/2. It would also be his final album with Def Jam, after being signed to the label for 18 years.

Background
During an interview, Redman stated that Reggie Noble (Redman's own birth name), does the album, not Redman. Redman also said that there is going to be more "poppish" type songs, rather than his normal "rugged" and "hardcore" songs. In regards to the album, he stated:

Release singles and promotion
The song titled "Coc Back" was the first single off the new album and features Ready Roc. The song and music video for the single were released simultaneously on October 31, 2009 through many websites. The first promotional single titled "Oh My" was released digitally online on January 25, 2010.

The next single, "Mind on My Money" was also released digitally online on March 2, 2010. A promo track titled "Lookin' Fly" has also been leaked by Redman. A video for "Lookin' Fly" was released on June 9, 2010. As it turns out, none of these tracks will make the final cut of the album, only being promo singles. The first official single is "Def Jammable" and a video for the single was released. This is the first Redman album where Erick Sermon won't be doing any production. The second official single is "Rockin' Wit Da Best" featuring Kool Moe Dee and was released on January 25, 2011.

Track listing
Credits adapted from the album's liner notes.

Sample credits
 "Reggie (Intro)" contains samples of "Swahililand", written and performed by Ahmad Jamal.

References

Concept albums
2010 albums
Redman (rapper) albums
Albums produced by DJ Khalil
Albums produced by Rockwilder
Albums produced by Tone Mason
Albums produced by Ty Fyffe